In the run-up to the next German federal election, various organisations carried out opinion polling to gauge voting intentions in Germany. Results of such polls are displayed in this list.

Poll results

Graphical summary

2023

2022

2021

CDU and CSU

By state

Bavaria

Brandenburg

Mecklenburg-Vorpommern

North Rhine-Westphalia

Rhineland-Palatinate

Saxony-Anhalt

Schleswig-Holstein

Thuringia

Chancellor polling 
These polls were conducted before the announcement of each party's Chancellor candidate, and gauged opinion on various politicians who were considered to be plausible candidates for their respective parties.

Scholz vs. Merz vs. Habeck  
Graph of opinion polls conducted

Scholz vs. Merz vs. Baerbock  
Graph of opinion polls conducted

Scholz vs. Merz 
Graph of opinion polls conducted

Scholz vs. Merz vs. Weidel

Scholz vs. Habeck

Merz vs. Habeck

Scholz vs. Söder

Scholz vs. Wüst

Scholz vs. Günther

Scholz vs. Röttgen

Scholz vs. Braun

Scholz vs. Laschet

Scholz vs. Kretschmer

Preferred coalition

Constituency projections

Direct mandates 
Graphic of possible distribution of direct mandates

By probability

Second place

References

External links 
Wahlrecht.de 
pollytix-Wahltrend 
DAWUM Wahltrend 
Twitter: @Wahlen_DE 

Next
German